This is an incomplete list of hurlers who have played at senior level for the Cork county team.



A

B

C

D

E

F

G

H

I

J

K

L

M

N

O

P

Q

R

S

T

W

Y

Top scorers

As of 28 May 2018

See also
 List of Cork inter-county footballers

 
Hurlers
Cork